Tetracera sarmentosa is a vine/climber and shrub in the Dilleniaceae family. It is native to parts of Tropical and Temperate Asia, from Peninsular Malaysia to Zhōngguó/China and Sri Lanka.

Description
A woody vine/climber, evergreen, growing up to 20m in Zhōngguó/China,
it can grow as a shrub in Bangladesh.
Scabrous branchlet that are hairy when young but become glabrous later. Leaves leathery, very scabrous, some 4-12 x 2-5 cm in size, at maturity the abaxial surface is glabrous, or only the veins pubescent. The carpels and sepals are glabrous. The 3 petals are white, some 4-5mm long. The orange fruit (follicle) are around 1 cm, thin and leathery pericarp is slightly bright when dry, and has persistent style. One black seed, with yellow aril, fringed, enclosing the base. Flowers from April to May in China, while in Tripura, India, it flowers from April to June and fruits from July and August.

Distribution
The area of Tetracera sarmentosa's indigenous growth is in Asia, both in tropical and temperate areas. Countries and regions where it occurs are: Peninsular Malaysia; Thailand; Vietnam; Zhōngguó/China (Southeast and South-central including Guangdong, Guangxi, Yunnan, Hainan); Laos; Myanmar; and Sri Lanka. It is reported from Bangladesh (regions of Chittagong, Chittagong Hill Tracts, Cox’s Bazar, and Satchari National Park, Habiganj district), from India (Gondacherra & Chawmanu, Dhalai District; Chamtilla, North Tripura District, Tripura), and Biswanath district, Assam), and in Indonesia (Bengkulu, Sumatera).

Habitat
It is one of the dominant taxa in the secondary tropical evergreen seasonal angiosperm lowland swamp forests of Central Vietnam (Hải Lăng District, Quảng Trị Province, and in the vicinity of Nha Trang, Khánh Hòa Province). At those areas it grows on sandy soil 10–50m elevation near the sea shore. In China the species occurs in sparse forests, thickets and on barren hills. In the Satchari National Park of Bangladesh it occurs on forest edges.

Vernacular names
In Standard Chinese the plant is known as 锡叶藤,  xi ye teng.
The plant is known as ulu ludi by Tanchangya people of the Chittagong Hill Tracts, Bangladesh).
A name used in English is sandpaper vine

Uses
The plant is one of the foods fed to captive elephants in Sri Lanka.
It is reported that Karbi and Munda peoples of Assam use cut stems to obtain water in dense forests where there is no other source.
The root extract of Tetracera sarmentosa is used for treatment of rheumatism by the Tanchangya people, Bangladesh. The species has a number of leaf extracts that have potential medical effects, though there is no evidence that the plant is effective against any disease.

History
The species was first described in 1794 by the Danish-Norwegian botanist, herbalist and zoologist Martin Vahl (1749-1804), in his Symbolae Botanicae.

Further reading
Additional information can be found in the following:
Dy Phon, P. (2000). Dictionnaire des plantes utilisées au Cambodge: 1–915. chez l'auteur, Phnom Penh, Cambodia. [Cites as synonym of Tetracera scandens]
Kress, W.J., DeFilipps, R.A., Farr, E. & Kyi, D.Y.Y. (2003). A Checklist of the Trees, Shrubs, Herbs and Climbers of Myanmar Contributions from the United States National Herbarium 45: 1–590. Smithsonian Institution.
Lê, T.C. (2005). Danh lục các loài thục vật Việt Nam [Checklist of Plant Species of Vietnam] 3: 1–1248. Hà Noi : Nhà xu?t b?n Nông nghi?p
Newman, M., Ketphanh, S., Svengsuksa, B., Thomas, P., Sengdala, K., Lamxay, V. & Armstrong, K. (2007). A checklist of the vascular plants of Lao PDR: 1–394. Royal Botanic Gardens, Edinburgh.
Sarder, N.U. & Hassan, M.A. (eds.) (2018). Vascular flora of Chittagong and the Chittagong Hill Tracts 2: 1–1060. Bangladesh National Herbarium, Dhaka.
Smitinand, T. & Larsen, K. (eds.) (1970-1975). Flora of Thailand 2: 1–484. The Forest Herbarium, Royal Forest Department.
Wu, Z., Raven, P.H. & Hong, D. (eds.) (2007). Flora of China 12: 1–534. Science Press (Beijing) & Missouri Botanical Garden Press (St. Louis).

References

sarmentosa
Flora of Guangdong
Flora of Guangxi
Flora of Hainan
Flora of Indo-China
Flora of Peninsular Malaysia
Flora of Sri Lanka
Flora of Yunnan
Plants described in 1794
Vines